John Smyth (1748–1811) was a British politician who sat in the House of Commons from 1783 to 1807.

Early life
Smyth was the son of John Smyth of Heath Hall, Heath, West Yorkshire and his wife Bridget Foxley, daughter of Benjamin Foxley of London. He was educated at Westminster School and was admitted at  Trinity College, Cambridge in 1766.

Career
Smyth served in Parliament as Member of Parliament  for Pontefract from 1783 to 1807. He was a Lord of the Admiralty, from 1791 to 1794, and a Lord of the Treasury, from 1794 1802. He was Master of the Mint from 1802 to 1804, and a Commissioner of the Board of Trade in 1805.

Personal life 
In 1778, Smyth married Lady Georgiana FitzRoy, eldest daughter of Augustus Henry FitzRoy, 3rd Duke of Grafton. Toge, they had four sons and two daughters. Their son
John Henry Smyth, of Heath Hall (1780-1822), member of parliament for Cambridge, had issue
John George Smyth, of Heath Hall, who had issue
Diana Elizabeth Smyth, who married Henry Lascelles, 4th Earl of Harewood (1824-1892) and had issue
Edwin Harry Lascelles (1861-1924)
Daniel Harry Lascelles (1862-1904)
George Algernon Lascelles (1865-1932), who married Mabel Caroline Elcocke Massey (died 1951) and had issue
Sybil Mary Lascelles (1907-1981), who married Humphrey Bradshaw Mellor Wright (1907-1997)
William Horace Lascelles (1868-1949), who married Madeline Barton (died 1950) and had issue
Mary Madge Lascelles (1900-1995)
Sir Daniel William Lascelles (1902-1967)
Pamela Diana Lascelles (1902-1988)
Susan Olivia Lascelles (1907-1995)
John Edward Lascelles (1911-1955)
Francis John Lascelles (1871-1925), who married Gertie Stradling, and had issue
Norah Gertrude Lascelles (1906-1972)
Eric James Lascelles (1873-1901)
Lady Susan Elizabeth Lascelles (1860-1925), who married Francis Richard Sutton
Lady Mary Lascelles (1877-1930), who married Robert Wentworth Doyne and had issue
Robert Harry Doyne (1899-1965), who married first Verena Seymour and second (1947) Nancy Butler and had issue
Patrick Robert Doyne (born 1936)
Diana Victoria Mary Doyne (born 1933), who married Robert Stephen Laurie
Bridget Cecilia Doyne (1949-2013)
Major-General Henry Smyth (-1816), CB, married Rebecca Mary, daughter of Thomas Peirce, and had issue
William John Smyth (1869-) of the Indian Civil Service, married Lilian May, daughter of Capt. Henry Clifford, RN, and had issue
Sir John George Smyth, 1st Baronet, VC MC, married and had issue
Herbert Edward FitzRoy Smyth, married and had issue
Lt-Col Henry Malcolm Smyth, of the 9th Gurkhas, also of MI6, the Special Police Corps, Germany, and Shanghai International Police, OBE
Maria Isabella Smyth (-1889), married her cousin Robert FitzRoy and had issue
Laura Maria Elizabeth FitzRoy (1858-1943), who died unmarried
Elizabeth Sarah Smyth, married Abraham Robarts, and had issue
Abraham John Robarts (1838-1926), who married Edith Barrington and had issue
Mary Edith Robarts (1870-1948), who married John Abdy Combe (1863-1929)
John Robarts (1872-1954), who married Margaret Georgina Louisa Cholmeley (1875-1967)
Gerald Robarts (1878-1961), who married Florence Fletcher and had issue
David John Robarts (1906-1989), chairman of the National Provincial Bank, married and had issue 
Anthony Vere Cyprian Robarts (1910-1982), married Grizel Mary Grant (1914-2004) and had issue
Peter Gerald Robarts (1915-1951)
Frances Smyth (-1892), married the politician Lt-Col Thomas Wood and had issue three sons and four daughters
Louisa Georgiana Smith (-1842), married Gervase Parker Bushe

Smyth died 12 February 1811 in London.

References

 

1748 births
1811 deaths
Members of the Parliament of Great Britain for English constituencies
British MPs 1780–1784
British MPs 1784–1790
British MPs 1790–1796
British MPs 1796–1800
Members of the Parliament of the United Kingdom for English constituencies
UK MPs 1801–1802
UK MPs 1802–1806
UK MPs 1806–1807
People educated at Westminster School, London
Alumni of Trinity College, Cambridge
Lords of the Admiralty
Masters of the Mint
Politicians from Pontefract